The Governor of Moscow Oblast is the governor of Moscow Oblast, a federal subject of Russia.

The governor is the highest-ranking official and head of administration of the government of Moscow Oblast, and is elected for a five-year term that is renewable once consecutively.

The current governor is Andrey Vorobyov of United Russia who took office on 8 November 2012.

History
Until 1995 the head of the Moscow Oblast was titled the Head of Administration of Moscow Oblast. In 1995, the Regional Duma adopted the new law about the Governor of Moscow Oblast, and since 1995, the head of the Oblast is titled Governor.

On 17 December 1995, elections for the governor of Moscow were held. Anatoly Tyazhlov, the head of administration, won the elections in the second round. The next elections for the governor and vice-governor of the Moscow Region were held on 19 December 1999 with the second round on 9 January 2000. State Duma deputy Boris Gromov (Fatherland bloc) was elected Governor of Moscow Oblast for a term of four years. In April 2001, the term of office of the governor was extended from 4 to 5 years. In December 2003 Gromov was re-elected with 83% of the vote.

In December 2004, at the initiative of President Vladimir Putin, the gubernatorial elections by direct popular vote were replaced by appointment by the legislative bodies on the presidential proposal. In May 2007 Boris Gromov was appointed for a third term. On 4 April 2012, Minister of Emergency Situations Sergey Shoigu was proposed by the United Russia party as a candidate for the governor. On April 5, Shoigu's candidacy was unanimously supported by the Moscow Oblast Duma. He took office on 11 May 2012.

On 8 November 2012, Russian President Vladimir Putin appointed Andrey Vorobyov as interim governor of Moscow Oblast. Two days earlier, Sergey Shoigu, who had been in charge of the region for only six months, was appointed Russian defence minister. For the next ten months Vorobyov remained acting governor, since from 2012 all regional and local elections in Russia are scheduled for September. On 9 September 2013, Vorobyov was elected fourth governor of the region, having received 78.94% of the votes.

List of officeholders

Latest election

The latest election for the office, the 2018 Moscow Oblast gubernatorial election, was held on 9 September 2018.

See also
 Moscow Regional Committee of the Communist Party of the Soviet Union - the party head was de facto governor

References

External links
Official website in Russian
Moscow Oblast Government

 
Politics of Moscow Oblast
Moscow Oblast